Suno may refer to:

People
 Ron Suno, US drill rapper, songwriter, comedian and youtuber
 Sarina Suno, Japanese violinist

Places
 Suno, Piedmont, Italy

Fictional characters
 Chase Suno from Monsuno
 Suno from Dragon Ball

Other
 Radio Suno 91.7, Malayalam language radio station in Qatar
 Southern University at New Orleans